Kendra Chavarría (born 25 November 1989) is a Panamanian footballer who plays as a midfielder. She has been a member of the Panama women's national team.

She has also captained the Panama women's national flag football team, winning the 2016 IFAF Flag Football World Championship. She began playing at the club level in 2011, lining up at both wide receiver and cornerback in the Liga de Flag Football Femenino de Panamá (LIFFF Panama).

International career
Chavarría represented the national under-20 team at the 2006 CONCACAF Women's U-20 Championship in Mexico.

Chavarría capped for Panama at senior level during the 2014 CONCACAF Women's Championship qualification.

See also
 List of Panama women's international footballers

References

Living people
1989 births
Women's association football midfielders
Panamanian women's footballers
Panama women's international footballers